Circulating free DNA (cfDNA) are degraded DNA fragments (50 - 200 bp) released to the blood plasma. cfDNA can be used to describe various forms of DNA freely circulating in the bloodstream, including  circulating tumor DNA (ctDNA), cell-free mitochondrial DNA (ccf mtDNA), and  cell-free fetal DNA (cffDNA). Elevated levels of cfDNA are observed in cancer, especially in advanced disease. There is evidence that cfDNA becomes increasingly frequent in circulation with the onset of age. cfDNA has been shown to be a useful biomarker for a multitude of ailments other than cancer and fetal medicine. This includes but is not limited to trauma, sepsis, aseptic inflammation, myocardial infarction, stroke, transplantation, diabetes, and sickle cell disease. cfDNA is mostly a double-stranded extracellular molecule of DNA, consisting of small fragments (50 to 200 bp)  and larger fragments (21 kb)  and has been recognized as an accurate marker for the diagnosis of prostate cancer and breast cancer.

Other publications confirm the origin of cfDNA from carcinomas and cfDNA occurs in patients with advanced cancer. Cell‐free DNA (cfDNA) is present in the circulating plasma and in other body fluids.

The release of cfDNA into the bloodstream appears by different reasons, including the primary tumor, tumor cells that circulate in peripheral blood, metastatic deposits present at distant sites, and normal cell types, like hematopoietic and stromal cells. Tumor cells and cfDNA circulate in the bloodstream of patients with cancer. Its rapidly increased accumulation in blood during tumor development is caused by an excessive DNA release by apoptotic cells and necrotic cells. Active secretion within exosomes has been discussed, but it is still unknown whether this is a relevant or relatively minor source of cfDNA.

cfDNA circulates predominantly as nucleosomes, which are nuclear complexes of histones and DNA. cfDNA can also be observed in shorter size ranges (e.g. 50bp) and associated with regulatory elements.  They are frequently nonspecifically elevated in cancer but may be more specific for monitoring cytotoxic cancer therapy, mainly for the early estimation of therapy efficacy.

History 
Circulating nucleic acids were first discovered by Mandel and Metais in 1948. It was later discovered that the level of cfDNA is significantly increased in the plasma of diseased patients. This discovery was first made in lupus patients and later it was determined that the levels of cfDNA are elevated in over half of cancer patients. Molecular analysis of cfDNA resulted in an important discovery that blood plasma DNA from cancer patients contains tumor-associated mutations and it can be used for cancer diagnostics and follow up. The ability to extract circulating tumor DNA (ctDNA) from the human plasma has led to huge advancements in noninvasive cancer detection. Most notably, it has led to what is now known as liquid biopsy. In short, liquid biopsy is using biomarkers and cancer cells in the blood as a means of diagnosing cancer type and stage. This type of biopsy is noninvasive and allows for the routine clinical screening that is important in determining cancer relapse after initial treatment.

Based on intracellular origin, cfDNA and immune system 
The intracellular origin of cfDNA, e.g., either from nucleus or mitochondria, can also influence the inflammatory potential of cfDNA. mtDNA is a potent inflammatory trigger. mtDNA, due to its prokaryotic origin, holds many features that are similar to bacterial DNA, including the presence of a relatively high content of unmethylated CpG motifs, which are rarely observed in nuclear DNA. The unmethylated CpG motifs are of particular importance as TLR9, the only endolysosomal DNA-sensing receptor, has a unique specificity for unmethylated CpG DNA. mtDNA was shown to activate neutrophils through TLR9 engagement  unless coupled to carrier proteins, mtDNA, but not nuclear DNA, can be recognized as a danger-associated molecular pattern inducing pro-inflammation through TLR9. Collins et al. reported that intra-articular injection of mtDNA induces arthritis in vivo, proposing a direct role of mtDNA extrusion in the disease pathogenesis of RA .

MtDNA, in contrast to nuclear DNA, is characterized by elevated basal levels of 8-OHdG, a marker of oxidative damage. The high content of oxidative damage in mtDNA is attributed to the close proximity of mtDNA to ROS and relatively inefficient DNA repair mechanisms that can lead to the accumulation of DNA lesions.

They have shown that oxidative burst during NETosis can oxidize mtDNA and the released oxidized mtDNA by itself, or in complex with TFAM, can generate prominent induction of type I IFNs. Oxidized mtDNA generated during programmed cell death is not limited to activate TLR9, but was shown to also engage the NRLP3 inflammasome, leading to the production of pro-inflammatory cytokines, IL-1β, and IL-18. MtDNA can also be recognized by cyclic GMP-AMP synthase (cGAS), a cytosolic dsDNA sensor to initiate a STING-IRF3-dependent pathway that in turn orchestrates the production of type I IFNs.

Methods

Collection and purification 
cfDNA purification is prone to contamination due to ruptured blood cells during the purification process. Because of this, different purification methods can lead to significantly different cfDNA extraction yields. At the moment, typical purification methods involve collection of blood via venipuncture, centrifugation to pellet the cells, and extraction of cfDNA from the plasma. The specific method for extraction of cfDNA from the plasma depends on the protocol desired.

Analysis of cfDNA

PCR 
In general, the detection of specific DNA sequences in cfDNA can be done by two means; sequence specific detection (PCR based) and general genomic analysis of all cfDNA present in the blood (DNA sequencing). The presence of cfDNA containing DNA from tumor cells was originally characterized using PCR amplification of mutated genes from extracted cfDNA. PCR based analysis of cfDNA typically rely on the analytical nature of qPCR and digital PCR. Both of these techniques can be sensitive and cost-effective for detecting limited number of hotspots mutations. For this reason the PCR based method of detection is still very prominent tool in cfDNA detection. This method has the limitation of not being able to detect larger structural variant present in ctDNA and for this reason massively parallel next generation sequencing is also used to determine ctDNA content in cfDNA

Massively Parallel Sequencing 
Massively parallel sequencing (MPS) has allowed the deep sequencing of cfDNA. This deep sequencing is required to detect mutant ctDNA present in low concentrations in the plasma. Two main sequencing techniques are typically used for analysis of mutant cfDNA; PCR amplicon sequencing and hybrid capture sequencing.
Other forms of genetic alterations can be analysed using ctDNA (e.g. somatic copy number alterations or genetic rearrangements). Here, methods based on untargeted sequencing, like WGS or low coverage WGS, are mainly used.

cfDNA and Illness

Cancer 
The majority of cfDNA research is focused on DNA originating from cancer (ctDNA). In short, the DNA from cancer cells gets released by cell-death, secretion or other mechanisms still not known. The fraction of cfDNA released by tumor cells in circulation is influenced by the size of the tumor as well as the tumor stage and type. Early stage cancers and brain tumor are among the most difficult to detect with liquid biopsy.

Trauma 
Elevated cfDNA has been detected with acute blunt trauma and burn victims. In both of these cases cfDNA concentration in the plasma were correlated to the severity of the injury, as well as outcome of the patient.

Sepsis 
It has been shown that an increase cfDNA in the plasma of ICU patients is an indicator of the onset of sepsis. Due to the severity of sepsis in ICU patients, further testing in order to determine the scope of cfDNA efficacy as a biomarker for septic risk is likely.

Myocardial Infarction 
Patients showing signs of myocardial infarction have been shown to have elevated cfDNA levels. This elevation correlates to patient outcome in terms of additional cardiac issues and even mortality within two years.

Transplant Graft Rejection 
Foreign cfDNA has been shown to be present in the plasma of solid organ transplant patients. This cfDNA is derived from the grafted organ and is termed dd-cfDNA (donor derived cell-free DNA). DdcfDNA values spike initially after a transplant procedure (>5%) with values heavily depending on the transplanted organ and typically drop (<0.5%) within one week. If the host body rejects the grafted organ the ddcfDNA concentration in the blood (plasma) will rise to a level greater than 5-fold higher than those without complications. This increase in ddcfDNA can be detected prior to any other clinical or biochemical signs of complication.
Besides ddcfDNA in plasma, some research also focused on the excretion of ddcfDNA through urine. This is of special interest in kidney allografts transplantation. 
When ddcfDNA is measured using targeted next-generation sequencing, assays were used with a population specific genome wide SNP panel. Attaching barcodes to the ligated adapters prior to NGS during library preparation make absolute ddcfDNA quantification possible without the need for prior donor genotyping . This has been shown to provide additional clinical benefits if the absolute number of cfDNA copies is considered combined together with the fraction of ddcfDNA over cfDNA from the recipient to determine whether the allograft is being rejected or not.

Future directions 

cfDNA allows a rapid, easy, non-invasive and repetitive method of sampling. A combination of these biological features and technical feasibility of sampling, position cfDNA as a potential biomarker of enormous utility for example for autoimmune rheumatic diseases and tumors. It offers also a potential biomarker with its own advantages over invasive tissue biopsy as a quantitative measure for detection of transplant rejection as well as immunosuppression optimisation. However, this method lacks uniformity on the type of sample (plasma/serum/synovial fluid/urine), methods of sample collection/processing, free or cell-surface bound DNA, cfDNA extraction and cfDNA quantification, and also in the presentation and interpretation of quantitative cfDNA findings.

cfDNA is quantified by fluorescence methods, such as PicoGreen staining and ultraviolet spectrometry, the more sensitive is quantitative polymerase chain reaction (PCR; SYBR Green or TaqMan) of repetitive elements or housekeeping genes, or deep sequencing methods. Circulating nucleosomes, the primary repeating unit of DNA organization in chromatin, are quantified by enzyme-linked immunosorbent assays (ELISA).

References 

DNA